Jamie Mitchell (born 6 November 1976) is a Scottish former footballer.

Mitchell began his career playing with Rangers BC and his services as a youngster were sought after.  He made the decision to sign with Norwich City, moving down with his parents at the age of 12 to England from Glasgow to sign for the East Anglian club who bought his parents a house to land the youngster. 

Having come through the successful youth system at Carrow Road alongside players like Danny Mills and Craig Bellamy winning several high profile youth tournaments including the prestigious Northern Ireland Milk Cup, Mitchell signed his first professional contract in 1995 under new manager Martin O'Neill, despite starring in the youth and reserve teams he failed to make a first team appearance whilst seemingly having the skill and technical level required he was deemed too lightweight to make an impact on the English Premier league and was surprisingly released from the Canaries who were going through a financial crisis in 1996. 

The assistant manager at Norwich Mick Wadsworth recognised Mitchell's potential and took him to English Div 3 side Scarborough F.C after Wadsworth had taken over the north east coast club, Mitchell joined for a 2-year spell, playing over 75 games winning a player of the year award and playing in the side that reached the Division 3 play off finals. Scarborough had mounting financial issues brewing and Mitchell left at the end of his contract in 1998.

Despite having offers to remain in England, Mitchell returned to his native Scotland and joined Clyde. Mitchell quickly became an integral part of the Clyde team, winning the Scottish Division 2 title and 3 consecutive player of the year awards, Mitchell was a fans favourite however left the club at the end of his contract on a Bosman and despite having several offers on the table he rather controversially joined Clyde's arch rivals  Partick Thistle who had just been promoted to the Scottish Premier League under legendary manager John Lambie. The move led to hate mail and death threats from irate fans of the Broadwood club.

Mitchell established himself in the side and made over 100 appearances over a 3 year spell for Thistle, at the beginning of the 2004/2005 season Mitchell received the sad news he was suffering from a degenerative right hip and upon diagnosis was advised to stop playing professional football immediately, he carried on playing through the injury for another season before being forced to retire playing professionally at the age of 28.

In 2010 it was reported in the Scottish Sun that Mitchell had a successful hip replacement operation at the age of 33 and was working in financial services for Tesco Bank.

References

External links

https://m.clydefc.co.uk/news/2002/05/17/129/#.Y1bmGjPTWDY

Scottish footballers
Norwich City F.C. players
Scarborough F.C. players
Clyde F.C. players
Partick Thistle F.C. players
Scottish Football League players
Scottish Premier League players
Living people
1976 births
English Football League players
Footballers from Glasgow
Association football midfielders